Khumjung  is a village in Khumbu Pasanglhamu rural municipality of Solukhumbu District in Province No. 1 of north-eastern Nepal. It is located in the Khumbu subregion inside Sagarmatha National Park, a world heritage site. The village is at an elevation of 3,790 metres above sea level, and is situated near Mount Khumbila.

A monastery in Khumjung has a purported Yeti scalp. This village has modern communications such as the internet and mobile and landline phones.

The village is the seat of ward no. 4, which include Kunde, Khumjung, Tengboche (Tyangboche), Pangboche, Pheriche, Dole, Chharchung, Machhermo, Lobuche, Dingboche, and Gokyo. As of 2011, it had a population of 1912 people living in 551 individual households.

Khumjung school was built by Sir Edmund Hillary's Himalayan Trust in 1961. The  school began as two classrooms but now caters for pre-school, primary and secondary sections with over 350 students.

History
Khumjung was a separate Village development committee in Solukhumbu District of Sagarmatha Zone of EDR in Nepal during Kingdom of Nepal. With new administrative structure on 10 March 2017, it became part of Khumbu Pasanglhamu rural municipality.

Climate

Galleries

References

External links

UN map of the municipalities of Solukhumbu District

Populated places in Solukhumbu District
Khumbu Pasanglhamu